The canton of Aixe-sur-Vienne is an administrative division of the Haute-Vienne department, western France. Its borders were not modified at the French canton reorganisation which came into effect in March 2015. Its seat is in Aixe-sur-Vienne.

It consists of the following communes:
 
Aixe-sur-Vienne
Beynac
Bosmie-l'Aiguille
Burgnac
Jourgnac
Saint-Martin-le-Vieux
Saint-Priest-sous-Aixe
Saint-Yrieix-sous-Aixe
Séreilhac
Verneuil-sur-Vienne

References

Cantons of Haute-Vienne